Prégent de Bidoux (c 1468 - 1528) was a French admiral, his name is also spelled Pregeant de Bidoux in some sources and he was also known as Peri Joan or Perrianni (a folk pronunciation of Prester John)

Bidoux was born in Gascony around 1468. he was active during the Italian Wars of the early 16th century. He fought against the Turks (1501) and the Venetians (1510). He was involved in a conflict against England and defeated Admiral Edward Howard in battle near Brest on 25 April 1513. Bidoux raided Sussex in 1514, burning Brighton but was wounded by an arrow. Bidoux joined the Knights Hospitaller based on Rhodes and fought against the Turks in 1522. He died in Marseille in 1528

References
 Goodwin, George. Fatal Rivalry, Flodden 1513, 2013, 
 Childs, David, The Warship Mary Rose: The Life and Times of King Henry VII's Flagship 
  - page in Italian Language

1468 births
1528 deaths
French Navy admirals
Military leaders of the Italian Wars
Knights Hospitaller